After Sex is a 2001 American comedy-drama film directed by Cameron Thor and starring Dan Cortese, Virginia Madsen and Brooke Shields.

Plot
A group of attractive women get together for a weekend of bonding, hoping to relax and get away from the anxiety of their boyfriends. The women travel out of town, which leads them to picking up men of questionable integrity. The next problem is what they will tell their boyfriends when they get back home.

Cast
 Dan Cortese as John
 Virginia Madsen as Traci
 Brooke Shields as Kate
 Maria Pitillo as Vicki
 Johnathon Schaech as Matt
 D. B. Sweeney as Tony

Reception
Nathan Rabin at The A.V. Club calls the film "a surprisingly glum comedic drama about three couples forced to rethink their commitment to each other after the women enjoy a bonding weekend that degenerates into relationship-threatening debauchery."

References

External links
 
 
 

2001 films
2001 comedy-drama films
2000s English-language films
American comedy-drama films
2000s American films